Southwest is a collaboration album by Daz Dillinger and Nuwine. It was released on June 24, 2003.

Preview
Daz Dillinger came with his long-awaited collaboration with Houston rapper Nuwine. As the title aptly suggests, the sound represents both the South and West coast. Featured artist include Slay, Black Diamond, Lil' Raskull and Maurice.

Track listing
 "Daz"
 "Freestyle" (featuring Slay & Black Diamond)
 "Floss With Us"
 "Big Daddy"
 "Riders" (featuring Raskull)
 "Money" (featuring Slay)
 "Daz and Nuwine"
 "Tell Me Hater" (featuring Maurice)
 "Girl Ya Know"
 "Back In My Life" (featuring Lil' Raskull)
 "Out of Time"
 "You Turned Your Back on Me"
 "Texas Screw" (Bonus Track)
 "Just Nuwine" (Bonus Track)

2003 albums
Daz Dillinger albums
Albums produced by Daz Dillinger